Bharti Fulmali (born 10 November 1994) is an Indian cricketer who plays for the Vidarbha women's cricket team. She has been playing cricket since she was 13, making her senior debut at the age of 17. In January 2019, she was named in India Blue's team for the 2018–19 Senior Women's Challenger Trophy.

In February 2019, she was named in India's Women's Twenty20 International (WT20I) squad for their series against England. She was one of two players from Vidarbha women, along with Komal Zanzad, to be selected for the national team. She made her WT20I debut for India against England on 7 March 2019.

References

External links
 

1994 births
Living people
Indian women cricketers
India women Twenty20 International cricketers
People from Amravati
IPL Trailblazers cricketers